Cleburne Building (also known as 924 West End Avenue) is an apartment building located at the northeast corner of West End Avenue and West 105th Street on the Upper West Side of Manhattan, New York City.

There is a memorial to Mr. and Mrs. Straus in nearby Straus Park.

The building, which is designed in the Arts and Crafts Movement style, has a handsome porte-cochère.

Notable residents
 Madeleine L'Engle
 Estelle Parsons
Andy Borowitz
 Norman Podhoretz and Midge Decter
 Charlie Smalls, composer of "The Wiz"

References

Residential buildings completed in 1913
Residential condominiums in New York City
West End Avenue
1913 establishments in New York City
Upper West Side
Residential buildings in Manhattan